Andrew or  Andy Nicholson may refer to:

Sports
 Andrew Nicholson (basketball) (born 1989), Canadian basketball player
 Andrew Nicholson (equestrian) (born 1961), New Zealand Olympic equestrian 
 Andrew Nicholson (speed skater) (born 1970), New Zealand Olympic speed skater

Others
 Andrew J. Nicholson, American Indologist (redirect)
 Andy Nicholson (active from 2002), English musician, formerly with the Arctic Monkeys
 Andy Nicholson (production designer) (active from 1993), American